Callyspongia (Cladochalina) johannesthielei is a species of demosponge in the family Callyspongiidae. It is found in Indonesia.

References

Callyspongiidae
Fauna of Indonesia
Animals described in 2020
Taxa named by Rob van Soest
Taxa named by John Hooper (marine biologist)